Belle-et-Houllefort is a commune in the Pas-de-Calais department in the Hauts-de-France region in northern France.

Geography

Population

Sights
 The ruins of a fortified house.
 The church at Belle, dating from the twelfth century.
 The church at Houllefort, dating from the seventeenth century.
 The sixteenth century manorhouse du Major.
 The Hôtel-de-ville, built in 1862.

See also
Communes of the Pas-de-Calais department

References

Communes of Pas-de-Calais